Šalčmiriai (formerly ) is a village in Kėdainiai district municipality, in Kaunas County, in central Lithuania. According to the 2011 census, the village has a population of 26 people. It is located 3 km from Akademija by the Kunkulis rivulet.

Demography

References

Villages in Kaunas County
Kėdainiai District Municipality